Emil Sandin (born February 28, 1988) is a Swedish former professional  ice hockey player. He is a forward who most recently was a member of IK Pantern in Allsvenskan.

He was drafted 199th overall by the Ottawa Senators in the 2008 NHL Entry Draft.

Career statistics

External links 

1988 births
Living people
Brynäs IF players
Ottawa Senators draft picks
Swedish ice hockey left wingers
Sportspeople from Uppsala